San Isidro, officially the Municipality of San Isidro, is a 2nd class municipality in the province of Nueva Ecija, Philippines. According to the 2020 census, it has a population of 54,372 people.

The municipality is bounded by Gapan to the east, the municipalities of San Leonardo and Jaen to the north, San Antonio to the west, Cabiao to the south-west, San Miguel, Bulacan, to the southeast and Candaba, Pampanga, to the south.

San Isidro became the capital of the Philippines during the First Republic while President Emilio Aguinaldo was moving north to avoid being captured by American forces.

History
San Isidro was the capital of Nueva Ecija from 1852 to 1912. After the first cry against the Spanish colonial government was made in 1896, there were 2,000 revolutionary soldiers under General Mariano Llanera who sieged San Isidro.

On March 29, 1899, General Emilio Aguinaldo declared San Isidro as the capital of the Philippines after the revolutionary capital Malolos, Bulacan was captured by the Americans. However, this was short-lived. General Frederick Funston planned the capture of Aguinaldo to end the Philippine–American War, in San Isidro.

The Wright Institute, established in 1903 in San Isidro, was the first high school established outside Manila during the American period.

The town was occupied by Japanese troops in 1942, during World War II. The combined U.S. and Philippine Commonwealth ground forces liberated San Isidro and defeated the Japanese forces in 1945 during the end of the war.

Contemporary period
On September 11, 1989, Mayor Enrique Lorenzo was on his way back from Manila to San Isidro with his wife Aurora, their driver and one of their security personnel when they were ambushed by four gunmen along the Sta. Mesa Bridge. Aurora and the two other companions died from their gunshot wounds while Mayor Lorenzo survived the attempted assassination with only his left shoulder wounded.

Geography

Barangays
San Isidro is divided into nine barangays.
Alua
Calaba
Malapit
Mangga
Poblacion
Pulo
San Roque
Santo Cristo
Tabon

Climate

Demographics

Religion
Majority of populace is Roman Catholic. Other religious groups have churches and places of worship.

Economy

Primarily depends on rice & vegetable farming, poultry and piggery.

As of 2017, based on Commission on Audit of the Philippines, San Isidro reached their income of P129,676,820.86; assets of P494,469,351.35; liabilities of P229,800,110.14 and allotments of P135,154,456.00.

Tourism
Carron Dreampark is an amusement and theme park in Barangay Santo Cristo, and was opened on November 17, 2012.
JF Sports Complex & Resort in Barangay Poblacion.

Education
Nueva Ecija University of Science and Technology, San Isidro Campus: started as a vocational course at the Wright Institute in San Isidro, Nueva Ecija where young Filipinos were trained in woodworking and basic telegraphy. This vocational course lasted until S.Y. 1927-1928 when the general secondary education course was transferred to Cabanatuan. On June 9, 1929, the school was renamed Nueva Ecija Trade School (NETS) in accordance with Vocational Education Act 3377 of 1929. The NETS was based in San Isidro, Nueva Ecija, offering vocational opportunities to the youth of the province. The first and only vocational course being offered then was woodworking. That course was an addition to the existing secondary curriculum inherited from the Wright Institute.
General de Jesus College: formerly known as General de Jesus Academy, is a private school located in the Poblacion, San Isidro, Nueva Ecija, the Philippines. It was founded in 1946.
Holy Rosary Colleges Foundation: private school at Calaba, San Isidro, Nueva Ecija.

Gallery

References

External links

San Isidro Official Website
[ Philippine Standard Geographic Code]
Philippine Census Information
Local Governance Performance Management System

Former provincial capitals of the Philippines
Municipalities of Nueva Ecija
Populated places on the Pampanga River